The Physics of Fire is the second album by the progressive death metal band Becoming the Archetype. Released on May 8, 2007, the album features a departure from the band's previous metalcore sound and shifts to a more progressive death metal sound. While the metalcore influences are still there, they are not as prominent as they were on Terminate Damnation. This is also the first and only album featuring Aletheian guitarist Alex Kenis.

Track listing 
 "Epoch of War" – 3:16
 "Immolation" – 5:29
 "Autopsy" – 4:08
 "The Great Fall (The Physics of Fire Pt. 1)" – 4:10
 "Nocturne" (Instrumental) – 3:19
 "The Monolith" – 3:46
 "Construct and Collapse" – 4:57
 "Endure" – 2:50
 "Fire Made Flesh (The Physics of Fire Pt. 2)" – 4:29
 "Second Death" – 6:03
 "The Balance of Eternity" – 8:49

Personnel
BTA
 Jason Wisdom –  lead vocals, bass guitar
 Alex Kenis – guitar, backing vocals
 Count Seth Hecox – guitar, keyboards
 Brent Duckett – drums

'''Production'
 Invisible Creature – art direction
 Andreas Magnusson – producer, engineering, mixing
 Chris Dowhan – engineering
 Troy Glessner – mastering
 David Stuart – photography
 Ryan Clark – design, artwork

Reception
This album was well received by the Christian metal community and critics alike. Jesusfreakhideout.com gave it 5 stars out of 5, saying that "The Physics Of Fire is among the most phenomenal records in its category and is destined to delight the ears of each metal listener captured."

References

Becoming the Archetype albums
Tooth & Nail Records albums
2007 albums
Solid State Records albums